Eden is an unincorporated community in Atchison County, Kansas, United States.  It is about 5 miles west and 5 miles north of Atchison.  It lies at the present-day intersection of Labette Rd, 322nd Rd, and 326th Rd.

History
A post office was opened in Eden in 1858, and remained in operation until it was discontinued in 1900.

References

Further reading

External links
 Atchison County maps: Current, Historic, KDOT

Unincorporated communities in Kansas
Unincorporated communities in Atchison County, Kansas
1858 establishments in Kansas Territory